Blyton Group is an Australian media and entertainment company. The company primarily operates in the radio industry under its subsidiary Capital Radio Network and owns hospitality, service and entertainment businesses in New South Wales.

History 
The company was started by Kevin Blyton who first acquired a radio station 2XL (now XLFM) in the Snowy Mountains and has since grown the radio network and expanded into hospitality. With the exception of XLFM, Snow FM and 3GG, all radio stations are operated as a 50/50 joint venture with Grant Broadcasters.

The current COO of Blyton Group is Josh Elliot. Former radio host with Capital Radio Network, Andrew Dunkerley, served as Operations Manager until his departure in July 2020.

In 2020, Blyton Group announced a 10-year master-plan for continued development of its Charlotte Pass Snow Resort, beginning with an upgraded chair lift.

In November 2021, Grant Broadcasters sold their wholly owned radio stations to ARN. Their share of Capital Radio Network stations and wholly owned Geelong stations K Rock and Bay 93.9 remained with the Grant Broadcasters' owners, the Cameron family.

Radio Network 
Operating under the name Capital Radio Network, the Blyton Group wholly owns three radio stations and has a joint venture with Grant Broadcasters for the remaining stations. The radio network operates in 5 locations across Australian Capital Territory, New South Wales, Victoria and Western Australia. The Snowy Mountains radio station organised the automated music for the Blyton Group's Magic Mountain amusement park speakers.

Wholly owned stations
 Snowy Mountains, New South Wales
 XLFM
 Snow FM
 Gippsland, Victoria
 3GG

Joint venture with Grant Broadcasters 

 Australian Capital Territory
2CC
 2CA
 MyDAB Canberra
 Snow FM (relayed from Snowy Mountains on DAB+)
 KIX Country
 New South Wales
Southern Tablelands
 GNFM
 Eagle FM
 KIX Country
 Snowy Mountains
 KIX Country
 Perth, Western Australia
 6iX
 X Digital
 KIX Country
 MyDAB Perth

Former stations 
In the 1990s, Kevin Blyton held a 40% stake in Newcastle's NXFM.

Outside of buying and selling stations in the same stations/territories as current stations, he has also held stations in Tasmania and owned Q92fm in Queenstown, New Zealand which he purchased in 1992.

Hospitality and services 
Blyton Group operates two snow resorts in the New South Wales Snowy Mountains region. The two resorts are Charlotte Pass Snow Resort and Selwyn Snow Resort.

The company also has multiple hotels as a part of their operations in the region:

 Kosciuszko Chalet Hotel, Charlotte Pass
 Lucy Lodge, Charlotte Pass
 Stillwell Hotel, Charlotte Pass
 Selwyn Accommodation Centre, Selwyn Snow Fields

In the 2019-2020 Australian summer bushfires, the Selwyn Snow Resort burned down, the Blyton Group has committed to rebuilding.

In addition to the resorts and hotels, the Blyton Group owns the Snowy Mountains Airport Corporation, which operates Cooma-Snowy Mountains Airport and as a part of their Charlotte Pass resort, operate an over-snow bus service linking the village to Perisher Valley.

Entertainment 
Group also operates the movie theatres in the Snowy Mountains townships of Jindabyne and Cooma. In Merimbula, the Blyton Group have the Magic Mountain amusement park.

References 

 
Australian radio networks